McElroy Ridge is a mountainous ridge,  long, in the Victory Mountains of Victoria Land, Antarctica. The ridge is bounded by the Gruendler, Trainer, Trafalgar and Rudolph Glaciers. It was mapped in part by the New Zealand Geological Survey Antarctic Expedition, 1957–58, and mapped in detail by the United States Geological Survey from surveys and U.S. Navy air photos, 1960–62. The ridge was named by the Advisory Committee on Antarctic Names for William D. McElroy, Director of the National Science Foundation, 1969–72.

References

Ridges of Victoria Land
Borchgrevink Coast